French Exit may refer to:

 French leave, an unannounced departure
 French Exit (1995 film), American film
 French Exit (album), 2014 album by the band TV Girl
 French Exit (novel), 2018 novel by Patrick deWitt
 French Exit (2020 film), based on the novel